Nelson Louis "Chicken" Hawks (February 3, 1896 – May 26, 1973) was a professional baseball player whose career spanned 14 seasons, two of which were spent with the Major League Baseball (MLB) New York Yankees (1921) and Philadelphia Phillies (1925). Hawks played as a first baseman for the Phillies and a outfielder for the Yankees. Over his career, Hawks compiled a career batting average of .316 with 68 runs scored, 124 hits, 17 doubles, eight triples, seven home runs, and 60 runs batted in over 146 games played. He played the majority of his career (12 seasons) in minor league baseball. He made his major-league debut at the age of 25 and was officially listed as standing  and weighing .

Early life
Hawks was born on February 3, 1896, in San Francisco, California.
He attended Santa Clara University  from 1915-1920.

Professional career
Hawks began his professional baseball career in 1918, when he played for the Oakland Oaks of the Pacific Coast League. He hit .248 over the season, with a home run and two triples. The following year, under manager Del Howard, Hawks recorded a perfect 1.000 batting average, with two hits in two at-bats over a game played. Next season he moved to the Calgary Bronchos, where he hit a Western Canada League-leading .359 off of a league-leading 161 hits. In 1921, Hawks made his MLB debut for the New York Yankees; for the Yankees, Hawks hit .288 with two home runs and 15 RBIs. After one-year stints with the Vernon Tigers, the Nashville Volunteers, and the St. Paul Saints, Hawks returned to the Volunteers for the 1924 season, where he hit a team-best .336 batting average, along with a .494 slugging percentage, second best on the Volunteers to Bevo LeBourveau's .536.

In his second MLB season, Hawks played for the Philadelphia Philles. Over the course of the year, Hawks hit .322, good for fifth best on the team. On September 8 of that season, he broke up a no-hitter by Dazzy Vance with a hit in the bottom of the second inning in an otherwise hit-less game for the Phillies. In Vance's next start against the Phillies, Hawks broke up a shutout when he scored on a sacrifice fly ball after moving to third base on an error by Jimmy Johnston.

After his season with the Phillies, Hawks played for the Newark Bears, Reading Keystones, Buffalo Bisons, San Francisco Seals, and Mission Reds until his retirement in 1931.

After baseball
After retiring from baseball, Hawks died from a heart attack on May 26, 1973, in San Rafael, California. He is interred at Cypress Lawn Memorial Park in Colma, California.

References

http://www.baseball-reference.com/schools/index.cgi?key_school=7bd21083

External links

1896 births
1973 deaths
Major League Baseball first basemen
Major League Baseball outfielders
Baseball players from California
New York Yankees players
Philadelphia Phillies players
Nashville Vols players